Satron is a hamlet in Swaledale, North Yorkshire, England. It is in the civil parish of Muker, but used to be in the ancient parish of Grinton.

The hamlet is on the south Bank of the River Swale and nestles on the northern edge of the B6270, the Kirkby Stephen to Downholme road through Swaledale.

The name of the village derives from Old Norse 'saetr' (summer pasture) from when Upper Swaledale was settled by the Norse peoples to graze cattle and sheep.

South of the hamlet is Satron Moor, which used to be worked for minerals as with much of the Upper Swaledale area. The waters were collected on the moor and used to 'hush' the minerals out. The water was then allowed to flow into Oxnop Beck. Mining ceased about 1870. Satron Moor is designated as a SSSI.

References

Villages in North Yorkshire
Swaledale